Carabus ignimitella is a species of ground beetle from family Carabidae. The species are black coloured.

References

ignimitella
Beetles described in 1888